James A. and Laura Thompson Long House is a historic home located at Roxboro, Person County, North Carolina.  It was built in 1896, and is a two-story, rectangular, Queen Anne style frame dwelling with a rear ell and enclosed rear porch.  It features round towers with conical roofs at the front corners, a one-story wraparound porch with Doric order columns, and a hipped slate roof with dormers.  The house was subdivided into apartments in the 1940s.  Its builder, J. A. Long (1841–1915), is considered the "founder of modern Roxboro."

The house was added to the National Register of Historic Places in 2005.

References

Houses on the National Register of Historic Places in North Carolina
Queen Anne architecture in North Carolina
Houses completed in 1896
Houses in Person County, North Carolina
National Register of Historic Places in Person County, North Carolina